Grizzly (also known as Killer Grizzly on U.S. television) is a 1976 American horror thriller film directed by William Girdler, about a park ranger's attempts to halt the wild rampage of an  tall,  Man-eating grizzly bear that terrorizes a National Forest, having developed a taste for human flesh. However, a drunken hunting party complicates matters. It stars Christopher George, Andrew Prine and Richard Jaeckel. Widely considered a Jaws rip-off, Grizzly used many of the same plot devices as its shark predecessor, which had been a huge box office success during the previous year.

Plot 
Military veteran helicopter pilot and guide Don Stober flies individuals above a  national park. He states that the woods are untouched and remain much as they did during the time when Native Americans lived there.

After breaking camp, two female hikers are attacked and killed by an unseen animal. The national park's Chief Ranger, Michael Kelly, and photographer Allison Corwin decide to follow a ranger to the primitive campsite to check on the hikers. There, they discover the mangled corpses, one of which has been partially buried.

At the hospital, a doctor tells Kelly that a large bear killed the girls. The park supervisor, Charley Kittridge, blames Kelly for the attacks, as the bears were supposed to have been moved from the park by Kelly and naturalist Arthur Scott before the tourist season began. Kelly and Kittridge argue over closing the park before deciding to move all hikers off the park's mountain, while allowing campers to remain in the lowlands. Kelly calls Scott and informs him of the bear attack.

During a search of the mountain, a female ranger stops for a break at a waterfall. Unaware that the bear is lurking nearby, she is killed while showering in the falls. Kelly recruits the helicopter pilot, Stober, to assist in the search. Flying above the forest, they see Scott adorned in animal skin while tracking the bear. Kelly and Stober scoff at the notion.

At the busy lowland campground, the grizzly kills another woman. Kelly once again insists on closing the park, but Kittridge still refuses. The attacks are becoming a national news story and, to counteract this, Kittridge allows amateur hunters into the forest. Kelly, Stober and Scott are disgusted by this development. Later, a lone hunter is chased by the grizzly, but manages to escape by jumping into a river and floating to safety. Later that night, three hunters find a bear cub. Believing it is the cub of the killer grizzly, they use it as bait for the mother. However, the grizzly finds and eats the cub without the hunters even noticing. Scott concludes that the grizzly is a male, as only male bears are cannibalistic. Kelly assigns fellow ranger Tom at a fire lookout tower on the mountain. However, the grizzly tears down the tower and kills Tom the next day. Kelly and Kittridge get into a heated argument over Kittridge's political ego.

On the outskirts of the national park, a mother and her young child are attacked by the grizzly. The mother is killed while the child survives, albeit severely mutilated. Stunned by this development, Kittridge finally allows Kelly to close down the park and ban all hunters.

Stober and Kelly now go after the elusive grizzly alone, setting up a trap by hanging a deer carcass from a tree. The scheme fails, as the grizzly takes the bait without getting caught. The next day, Scott, tracking on horseback, finds the remains of the deer carcass and calls Stober and Kelly on the radio. He plans to drag the deer carcass behind his horse and create a trap by leading the grizzly towards them. However, the grizzly ambushes Scott, killing his horse and knocking Scott unconscious. He awakens a short time later to find himself half-buried in the ground. Just as he finishes digging himself out, the grizzly returns and kills him.

Kelly and Stober discover Scott's mutilated body and, in despair, return to the helicopter to track the grizzly from the air. They soon spot the grizzly in a clearing. The grizzly attacks the helicopter, swiping at the craft and causing Stober to be thrown clear. The grizzly kills Stober before turning on Kelly, who frantically pulls a bazooka from the helicopter. Before the grizzly can reach him, Kelly fires at the grizzly, killing him in a large explosion. For several seconds, Kelly sadly stares at the burning remains of the grizzly before walking towards Stober's mutilated body.

Cast 
 Christopher George as Michael Kelly
 Andrew Prine as Don Stober
 Richard Jaeckel as Arthur Scott
 Joan McCall as Allison Corwin
 Joe Dorsey as Charley Kittridge
 Charles Kissinger as Dr. Hallitt
 Mike Clifford as Pat
 Teddy as the Grizzly

Production 
The idea for Grizzly began when the film's producer and writer, Harvey Flaxman, encountered a bear during a family camping trip. Co-producer and co-writer David Sheldon thought the idea would make a good film following the success of Jaws. Girdler discovered the script on Sheldon's desk and offered to find financing as long as he could direct the film. Within a week, Girdler was able to obtain $750,000 in financing from Edward L. Montoro's Film Ventures International movie distribution company.

Grizzly was filmed on location in Clayton, Georgia, with many local residents cast in supporting roles. Catherine Rickman, who played one of the first victims, was actually the daughter of Clayton's mountain man, Frank Rickman. Though unintentional, the casting of George, Prine, and Jaeckel marked the second time this trio of actors starred together in the same film. They had previously played supporting roles in the western Chisum (1970) starring John Wayne. A Kodiak bear nicknamed Teddy performed as the killer grizzly bear. Teddy was 11 feet tall and was the largest bear in captivity at that time. The bear was rented from the Olympic Game Ranch in Sequim, Washington, where he was kept behind an electric fence. The crew was protected from the bear by a piece of green string running through the shooting locations and a ticking kitchen timer. This resembled (to the bear) an electric fence. Actors and crew members were instructed to always stay on the camera side of the string. The bear did not actually roar, so it was tricked into making the motions of roaring by throwing several marshmallows into its mouth and then holding a final marshmallow in front of its face, but not throwing it. The bear would stretch for it. The sound was artificially produced.

The original artwork for the Grizzly film poster was created by popular comic book artist Neal Adams.

A movie tie-in novelization by Will Collins (a pseudonym of Edwin Corley) was published in 1976 by Pyramid Books and accompanied the film's release.

Reception 
Critical reception for Grizzly in 1976 was extremely negative, with most critics criticizing the film for being too similar to Steven Spielberg's thriller Jaws. Vincent Canby, from the New York Times, criticized the film's poor plotting, cinematography and editing. He wrote, "Grizzly, which opened yesterday at the Rivoli and other theaters, is such a blatant imitation of Jaws that one has to admire the depth of the flattery it represents, though not the lack of talent involved." 
Donald Guarisco from AllMovie gave the film a negative review, criticizing the film's script, cheap gore, and overuse of clichés, and saying, "This energetic but clumsy horror effort is too contrived and poorly realized to be worthwhile for most viewers."
Film critic Leonard Maltin awarded the film two out of four stars, calling it an "OK rip-off of Jaws".

Despite the negative reviews, Grizzly was the top grossing independent film of 1976, earning nearly $38 million worldwide, and held the record until Halloween was released two years later in 1978. The film's executive producer, Edward L. Montoro, president of Film Ventures International distributed the film in the U.S. and Canada and sold the worldwide distribution rights to Columbia Pictures for $1.5 million. Montoro later tried to keep the profits to himself instead of paying the film's director William Girdler and producers/writers David Sheldon and Harvey Flaxman. The three sued Montoro and he was eventually ordered by the Los Angeles County Superior Court to pay Girdler, Sheldon and Flaxman their share of the profits from the distribution of the film.

The original music score by Robert O. Ragland has since been largely well received. Ragland commissioned the National Philharmonic Orchestra for the film's theme. The original soundtrack was finally released on CD and MP3 format in September 2018.

On the film review website Rotten Tomatoes the film holds a 44% rating based on nine reviews, with an average rating of 4.6 out of 10.

Home media 
Grizzly was released on VHS by Anchor Bay Entertainment. It was released in the LaserDisc format in 1984 by RCA/Columbia Pictures Home Video, but only in Japan.

The DVD of Grizzly was first released on December 2, 1998 by Shriek Show, and it was re-released on DVD by Scorpion Releasing on August 5, 2014. Scorpion Releasing issued a limited-edition Blu-ray in September 2015 exclusively through Screen Archives Entertainment.

On April 21, 2017, RiffTrax released a video on demand of the film with comedy commentary by Michael J. Nelson, Kevin Murphy and Bill Corbett.

In 2021, it was re-released Region Free on DVD and Blu-ray by Severin Films.

Sequel 

A sequel was filmed in Hungary in 1983. It was directed by André Szöts from a screenplay by David Sheldon and his wife Joan McCall, with Suzanne C. Nagy as executive producer. The film, about a giant female grizzly bear who seeks revenge after her cub is killed by poachers, features Steve Inwood, Louise Fletcher, John Rhys-Davies, Deborah Raffin and Deborah Foreman, with special appearances by George Clooney, Laura Dern, Charlie Sheen and Timothy Spall. The film remained officially unreleased until 2020, subsequently being shown at various film festivals. Prior to its official release, a bootleg version of the footage shot for the film, not always coherent at times, circulated on VHS and DVD over the years. It was released on DVD and Blu-ray through video on demand and home video in January 2021.

References

External links 
 
 
 
 

1976 films
1976 horror films
1970s horror thriller films
1976 independent films
American horror thriller films
American independent films
American natural horror films
Films about bears
Films directed by William Girdler
Films scored by Robert O. Ragland
Films set in forests
Grizzly bears in popular culture
American survival films
1970s English-language films
1970s American films